Hellula undalis, the cabbage webworm or Old World webworm, is a moth of the family Crambidae. It is a widespread species which is found from Europe across Asia to the Pacific. It was first described from Italy.

The wingspan is about 18 mm. Adult moths have fawn forewings, each with sinuous pale lines and a kidney-shaped mark. The hindwings are a uniform grey darkening at the margins.

The larvae feed on a wide range of plants, mainly of the family Brassicaceae. Recorded food plants include broccoli, crucifers, head cabbage, Chinese cabbage, spoon cabbage, daikon radish, horseradish, mustard, radish and turnip. It is considered a serious agricultural pest. The larvae initially bore into the stem of growing shoots, later instars mine the leaves and leaf stems. It makes a web of silk around the feeding area which accumulates frass. The caterpillar is 12–15 mm long and is whitish with pinkish-brown longitudinal stripes.

Pupation occurs within this silken shelter. The pupa is formed in a loose cocoon of webbed-together particles of soil or other matter and is about 8 mm long, shining pale brown with a dark stripe on the back.

References

External links

UKMoths
Fauna Europaea
Insects of Australia
Image of the Larva

Glaphyriini
Moths of Africa
Moths of Europe
Moths of the Middle East
Moths of Cape Verde
Moths of the Comoros
Moths of Japan
Moths of Madagascar
Moths of Mauritius
Moths of New Zealand
Moths of Réunion
Moths of Seychelles
Moths of Asia
Moths described in 1794
Taxa named by Johan Christian Fabricius